Anthurium pedatoradiatum or Anthurium Fingers is a species of plant in the genus Anthurium native to southern Mexico. A. pedatoradiatum has leaves with deep finger-like sections, and is terrestrial. It is related to other Anthurium in the section Schizoplacium such as Anthurium podophyllum, and its species name in Latin refers to the radiating growth of its palm-like leaves.

References

External links

pedatoradiatum
Plants described in 1859